Gregory Mahabir (born 18 January 1981) is a Trinidadian cricketer. He played in nineteen first-class and eleven List A matches for Trinidad and Tobago from 2000 to 2006.

See also
 List of Trinidadian representative cricketers

References

External links
 

1981 births
Living people
Trinidad and Tobago cricketers
Trinidad and Tobago people of Indian descent